Dehorokkhi ( Bodyguard) is a Bangladeshi action film directed by Iftakar Chowdhury. The film was produced by Fatman Films. Dehorokkhi is an action based romantic triangle film. The film features  Bobby, Anisur Rahman Milon, Kazi Maruf, Shiba Shanu and Shimul Khan. The film marks 55 years of Bangladeshi film industry. Dehorokkhi was released on 50 screens. The movie created a buzz through its trailer in social networking sites. The music was distributed by G-Series.

Plot
This is the story of Sohana, a dancer who is her family's breadwinner and a dancer at a bar. Aslam, a man belonging to the underworld, falls in love with her but she rebuffs his advances. For Sohana's security, Aslam hires a bodyguard, and the story takes a new turn.

Cast
 Bobby as Sohana 
 Anisur Rahman Milon as Aslam 
 Kazi Maruf as Tibro
 Shiba Shanu as Sizar 
 Kazi Hayat as Sohana's Father
 Prabir Mitra as Ramzan Chacha
 Shimul Khan as Kunta
 Ratan Khan

Review
The film prompted old producers to return to producing film in the Bangladesh Film Development Corporation (BFDC). Iftakar Chowdhury, Bobby, Milon, Music Adit & Simul Khan became instant stars after the release of the film. The role of Anisur Rahman Milon was highly praised.

Music

References

External links
 

2013 films
2013 action films
Bangladeshi action films
Bengali-language Bangladeshi films
Films scored by Adit Ozbert
2010s Bengali-language films